Alfred Spencer (8 March 1887 – 13 January 1966) was a British gymnast. He competed in nine events at the 1924 Summer Olympics.

References

External links
 

1887 births
1966 deaths
British male artistic gymnasts
Olympic gymnasts of Great Britain
Gymnasts at the 1924 Summer Olympics
Place of birth missing